The Bentsjord Estate (Norwegian: Bentsjordgodset), also known as the Moursund Estate (Norwegian: Det moursundske gods), was an estate in Troms, Norway.

History

Owners
From 1783, the southern part of the Tromsø Estate belonged to the Moursund family, whose seat was the Bentsjord Farm. Through his marriage to Elisabeth Wasmuth, who was the heiress to part of the Tromsø Estate, Hans Andreas Moursund (died 1802) became the owner of this land. His son was Andreas Røst Moursund (died 1850), whose only son was Hans Andreas Moursund (1818–1880). Hans Andreas Moursund Jr. started selling off the estate.

Sale of farms and forest
Many farm parcels were sold to their respective tenant farmers in and after 1862. In 1892, the state bought the forest, which was subsequently sold to the tenant farmers. The Bentsjord Farm was sold at auction in 1890. By 1900, the Bentsjord Estate had been effectively dissolved.

Notable people
Notable people born at the Bentsjord Estate include:
Kristian Moursund (1853–1892), lawyer and Storting representative

See also
 List of Norwegian estates

Literature and sources
 Store norske leksikon: Moursund
 Store norske leksikon: Moursundske gods

Troms